The 2015 Betway UK Championship was a professional ranking snooker tournament that took place between 24 November and 6 December 2015 at the Barbican Centre in York, England. It was the fourth ranking event of the 2015/2016 season.

The 2014 champion Ronnie O'Sullivan, who had not played in professional competition since April, decided not to defend his title. He made his debut as a pundit during the tournament, providing in-studio expert analysis for Eurosport alongside Jimmy White.

On the opening day of the tournament, amateur player Adam Duffy defeated world number 9 and two-time UK Champion Ding Junhui 6–2, a result that was described as "one of the biggest upsets in UK Championship history". In the sixth frame of his third-round match against Neil Robertson, Thailand's Thepchaiya Un-Nooh came close to achieving his first maximum break in professional competition, but missed the final black off the spot.

The final between Australia's Neil Robertson and China's Liang Wenbo marked the first time that a British player did not compete in the UK Championship final. In the sixth frame, Robertson made the 115th official maximum break in professional competition, and the first 147 break ever attained in a Triple Crown snooker final, for which he earned £44,000 (a rolling prize of £40,000 for a 147 break, plus the tournament's £4,000 highest break prize). It was the fourth time in a row, that a maximum was made in a UK Championship. Robertson went on to defeat Liang 10–5 to claim his second UK Championship title, and the 11th ranking title of his career.

A record 104 centuries were made during the tournament, including nine from Robertson and eight from Liang.

Prize fund
The breakdown of prize money for this year is shown below:

 Winner: £150,000
 Runner-up: £70,000
 Semi-final: £30,000
 Quarter-final: £20,000
 Last 16: £12,000
 Last 32: £9,000
 Last 64: £4,000

 Highest break: £4,000
 Total: £732,000

The "rolling 147 prize" for a maximum break stands at £40,000 (8 ranking events since it was last won, £5,000 added for each ranking event)

Main draw

Top half

Section 1

Section 2

Section 3

Section 4

Bottom half

Section 5

Section 6

Section 7

Section 8

Finals

Final

Century breaks
Source: World Professional Billiards and Snooker Association (worldsnookerdata.com)

 147, 145, 126, 120, 114, 113, 106, 106, 101  Neil Robertson
 143, 126, 100  Stuart Bingham
 142, 128, 127  Anthony McGill
 141  Gary Wilson
 140, 116  Thepchaiya Un-Nooh
 138, 132, 122, 110, 110, 106, 104, 104  Liang Wenbo
 138  Gerard Greene
 137, 128  Mark Davis
 136  David Morris
 135, 109, 101  Peter Ebdon
 135  Anthony Hamilton
 135  Liam Highfield
 134, 134, 129, 119, 103, 102  John Higgins
 133, 113, 106  Mark Selby
 133, 111, 111, 110  Jamie Jones
 133  Fergal O'Brien
 132, 119  Ken Doherty
 131, 127, 125, 108  Martin Gould
 131, 107  Xiao Guodong
 129, 121  Ben Woollaston
 127, 125, 118  Stephen Maguire
 126, 100  Chris Wakelin
 125, 111  Tom Ford
 124, 106, 102, 100  Shaun Murphy
 123, 113  Dechawat Poomjaeng

 123  Mark King
 123  Alex Taubman
 118  Jimmy Robertson
 117  Matthew Selt
 116  Tian Pengfei
 115, 107, 102, 102  Mark Allen
 114, 103  Li Hang
 112, 101  Judd Trump
 112  Sam Baird
 111  Jamie Burnett
 110  Mike Dunn
 108, 102  Michael Holt
 108  Stuart Carrington
 105  Mark Williams
 105  Barry Pinches
 104, 103, 102  Marco Fu
 104  Jimmy White
 102  Ali Carter
 102  Luca Brecel
 101  Graeme Dott
 101  Joe Perry
 101  Oliver Lines
 100  David Grace
 100  Dominic Dale

References

External links
 Betway UK Championship at World Snooker

2015
UK Championship
UK Championship
UK Championship
UK Championship